Sansei Technologies, Inc. (formerly Sansei Yusoki Co., Ltd.) is a manufacturing firm based in Osaka, Japan. The company specialises in the manufacturing of amusement rides, stage equipment, and elevators.

History
Sansei Yusoki was founded on February 27, 1951. Since then the company has expanded with many subsidiaries including Sansei Maintenance, Sansei Facilities, San Ace, and Telmic Corporation. In 2012, Sansei Yusoki acquired a majority stake in United States-based amusement ride manufacturing firm, S&S Worldwide. As of 2013, the company is led by President Makoto Nakagawa and employs 700 staff. On January 1, 2014, the company began operating as Sansei Technologies, Inc. On March 30, 2018, Sansei fully acquired Vekoma Rides, a Dutch manufacturer of roller coasters and other amusement rides.

Amusement ride manufacturing
The majority of Sansei Technologies' manufacturing is done for Japanese parks. Despite that, Sansei Technologies' biggest clients are Disney and Universal, with many other amusement parks from across the world featuring amusement rides manufactured by the firm.

Amusement rides

List of roller coasters

As of 2019, Sansei Technologies has built 20 roller coasters around the world.

Notes

References

External links
 

Amusement ride manufacturers
Manufacturing companies established in 1951
Manufacturing companies of Japan
Roller coaster manufacturers
Companies listed on the Tokyo Stock Exchange
Companies based in Osaka Prefecture
Japanese companies established in 1951